Oakland High School may refer to:

Oakland High School (Oakland, California), Oakland, California
Oakland High School (Oregon), Oakland, Oregon
Oakland High School (Illinois), Oakland, Illinois
Oakland High School (Tennessee), Murfreesboro, Tennessee
Oakland Alternative High School, Tacoma, Washington
Oakland Catholic High School, Pittsburgh, Pennsylvania
Oakland Craig High School, Oakland, Nebraska
Oakland Mills High School, Columbia, Maryland
Oakland School for the Arts, Oakland, California
Oakland Technical High School, Oakland, California